Łukasz Góra (born 4 October 1993) is a Polish professional footballer who plays as a centre-back for Stal Rzeszów.

Career

Chrobry Głogów
On 28 May 2019 Chrobry Głogów confirmed, that they had signed Góra on a one-year contract.

Stal Rzeszów
On 29 January 2020, he moved to Stal Rzeszów.

Honours
Stal Rzeszów
II liga: 2021–22

References

External links

1993 births
People from Lubliniec
Sportspeople from Silesian Voivodeship
Living people
Polish footballers
Association football defenders
Gwarek Zabrze players
Raków Częstochowa players
Chrobry Głogów players
Stal Rzeszów players
I liga players
II liga players